The Autovía A-19, named Autopista del Maresme, was a highway in Catalonia. In 1995, the road was re-named Autopista C-32 and comprises a motorway built along the coast south from Barcelona via Castelldefels, Sitges, and Vilanova i la Geltrú.

There are a series of tunnels such Garraf. The road has tolls.

References

A-19
A-19